
Year 266 BC was a year of the pre-Julian Roman calendar. At the time it was known as the Year of the Consulship of Pera and Pictor (or, less frequently, year 488 Ab urbe condita). The denomination 266 BC for this year has been used since the early medieval period, when the Anno Domini calendar era became the prevalent method in Europe for naming years.

Events 
 By place 

 Roman Republic 
 January 23 – Marcus Atilius Regulus and Lucius Julius Libo celebrate triumphs over the Salentini.
 Calabria and Messapia are annexed by the Roman Republic.

 Asia Minor 
 Ariobarzanes becomes the second king of Pontus, succeeding his father Mithridates I Ctistes.

 India 
 The Mauryan emperor Ashoka converts to Buddhism.

Births 
 Berenice II, queen and co-regent of Egypt (or 267 BC)

Deaths 
 Huiwen of Zhao, Chinese king of Zhao (b. 310 BC)
 Mithridates I Ctistes, founder of the kingdom of Pontus

References